Members of the New South Wales Legislative Assembly who served in the 33rd  parliament held their seats from 1941 to 1944. They were elected at the 1941 state election, and at by-elections. During this term, the opposition United Australia Party merged with the new Commonwealth Party to form the Democratic Party in late 1943. The merger was only at a state level, however; the federal United Australia Party, however, remained intact during this period. The Speaker was Daniel Clyne.

See also
First McKell ministry
Results of the 1941 New South Wales state election
Candidates of the 1941 New South Wales state election

References

Members of New South Wales parliaments by term
20th-century Australian politicians